Metacomic is a metafictional comics style in which the characters realize that they are living in a comic. In a metacomic, the characters are able to take advantage of the comic's structure to progress in the storyline. In brief, a metacomic is a comic about a comic.

Elements
 Using the comic structure as an advantage (making the characters travel across comic panels, interact with speech balloons and other panels, or using the characters' speech as a "real", solid object).
 Drawing the author themselves into the comic to act as a character and interact with other characters.
 Using direct help from the author (the author's "hand" might appear to the comic and draw a helpful object, delete enemies with an eraser, or touch/move the characters).

Examples
 Krazy Kat by George Herriman
  by 
 Understanding Comics by Scott McCloud
 Opus by Satoshi Kon
 Deadpool in Marvel Comics
 The author of and characters from the webcomic Sinfest
 The creators of the graphic novel Logicomix
 Imbattable by Pascal Jousselin
 Gwenpool in Marvel Comics

Comics genres